The Grand Prix Eric De Vlaeminck is a cyclo-cross race on and around the circuit Terlaemen in Heusden-Zolder, Belgium.  The race is named after seven times world champion cyclo-cross Eric De Vlaeminck. Until 2019 it was part of the UCI Cyclo-cross World Cup but since 2020 it is part of the Superprestige. It is traditionally held on 26 December. In 2003 and 2004, it was a summercross.

Winners

Men

Women

This list is incomplete.

References

External links
 
 

UCI Cyclo-cross World Cup
Cyclo-cross races
Cycle races in Belgium
Circuit Zolder
Sport in Limburg (Belgium)